Megachile nigella is a species of bee in the family Megachilidae. It was described by Vachal in 1908.

References

Nigella
Insects described in 1908